The tropical pocket gopher (Geomys tropicalis) is a species of rodent in the family Geomyidae. It is endemic to Mexico.
Its natural habitat is hot deserts. It is threatened by habitat loss.

Description
The tropical pocket gopher is cinnamon to brown on its back and head. Its underparts have white fur, and its tail is mostly naked. They have large front feet, along with small eyes and a thick body. Males are on average larger than females.

Distribution and habitat
The distribution of the tropical pocket gopher is restricted to a small area of the Veracruz moist forests, near the southeastern corner of Tamaulipas, Mexico.

Genetics
The tropical pocket gopher has a diploid number of 38. This is low compared to similar species. This could help them adapt to their restricted habitat. Since their numbers are low there is a high risk of them losing too much genetic variability to survive.

References

Tropical Pocket Gopher
Endemic mammals of Mexico
Veracruz moist forests
Natural history of Tamaulipas
Critically endangered animals
Critically endangered biota of Mexico
Mammals described in 1915
Taxonomy articles created by Polbot